A list of Argentine films released in 2019.

2019 films

January–March

April–June

July–September

October–December

2019 box office 
Since January 1 until March 9, Argentine films sold less than 200,000 tickets, only a 2.5% of the total ticket sales (7,790,000). In the previous year, the share of Argentine cinema in the local box office was almost 15%. In contrast, there was an increment of 19% in the number of films released in the same period compared to the past year.

Most successful films

See also 
2019 in Argentina
List of 2019 box office number-one films in Argentina
List of Argentine films of 2018
List of Argentine films of 2020

References 

2019
Argentine